Robbert Olijfveld (born 15 August 1994) is a Dutch footballer who plays for Tweede Divisie club Rijnsburgse Boys.

Career

Early years
Born in Rotterdam, Olijfveld started playing football at age five for SV Bolnes, and would continue his youth career at various clubs in the Rotterdam area. In 2010, he joined the Feyenoord academy, where he played alongside Jean-Paul Boëtius, Anass Achahbar and Tonny Vilhena before suffering a knee injury. He subsequently moved to the Sparta Rotterdam youth academy after being released by Feyenoord.

Sparta Rotterdam
On 15 March 2014, Olijfveld made his professional debut for Sparta Rotterdam in the Eerste Divisie, as a substitute against Almere City, a match which ended in a 0–1 loss. A week later he appeared as a starter against Achilles '29 in a 1-1 draw, in which he scored the opening goal in the 61st minute. Olijfveld also started a week later, against FC Eindhoven, in a match which ended in a 4-0 loss.

In parallel, Olijfveld appeared as a starter for the under-21 team of the club, Jong Sparta, in the Beloften Eredivisie, the league for reserve teams, where he became top goalscorer in his final season at the club.

ASWH
In the summer of 2015, he moved to ASWH, where he helped the club achieve promotion from the Hoofdklasse to the Derde Divisie, amongst others by scoring the decisive goal in the final game to secure promotion against VV Noordwijk.

IJsselmeervogels
Ahead of the 2017–18 season, Olijfveld joined Tweede Divisie club IJsselmeervogels. He made his debut for the club in a KNVB Cup matchup against VV Noordwijk, where he came on as a 79th-minute substitute for Christiaan van Hussen in a 3–2 loss. The following week, on 26 August, Olijfveld made his first appearance in the Tweede Divisie in a 1–0 home win over Kozakken Boys, coming on as a substitute in the 60th minute for Soufian Moro. He finished his first season for IJsselmeervogels with 34 total appearances in which he scored 14 goals, as the club finished 9th in the league table.

Rijnsburgse Boys
In December 2020, it was announced that Olijfveld would join Rijnsburgse Boys from the start of the 2021–22 season on a one-year contract with an option for an additional season. He made his debut for the club on 21 August 2021 as a substitute for Dani van der Moot in the 70th minute of a 3–0 away win over GVVV.

References

External links
 

1994 births
Living people
Footballers from Rotterdam
Dutch footballers
Eerste Divisie players
Tweede Divisie players
Derde Divisie players
Vierde Divisie players
Excelsior Rotterdam players
Feyenoord players
Sparta Rotterdam players
ASWH players
IJsselmeervogels players
Rijnsburgse Boys players
Association football forwards